Cnemaspis phuketensis  is a species of gecko endemic to southern Thailand.

References

phuketensis
Reptiles described in 2004